Nicole Roth (born 8 May 1995) is a German female handball player for Thüringer HC and the German national team.

She is part of the German 35-player squad for the 2022 European Women's Handball Championship in North Macedonia/Montenegro/Slovenia. She also participated at the 2011 European Women's U-17 Handball Championship and 2014 Women's Junior World Handball Championship.

Achievements
Bundesliga:
Silver: 2018
Bronze: 2019
DHB-Pokal:
Winner: 2014

References

1995 births
Living people
Sportspeople from Nuremberg
German female handball players